Pacham may refer to:
 Pacham, Kerman
 Pacham, Mazandaran (disambiguation)